The Council for World Mission (CWM) is a worldwide community of mainly protestant Christian churches. The 32 members share their resources of money, people, skills and insights to carry out their mission work.

Leadership
The 32 member churches are represented by 128 delegates, four per member church, who elect the Moderator, Treasurer, and all members of the Board of Directors. The 32 member churches meet annually to approve any amendments to the Memorandum and Articles of Association of CWM; appoint the General Secretary; and to admit or expel members upon the recommendation of the Board of Directors.
Rev. Dr Jooseop Keum is the General Secretary of Council for World Mission (CWM). He also teaches as guest professor at Yonsei University in the Republic of Korea and Stellenbosch University in South Africa.

History 
CWM was established in 1977 by the London Missionary Society (LMS, founded 1795), the Commonwealth (Colonial) Missionary Society (1836) and the (English) Presbyterian Board of Missions (1847). Most member churches have backgrounds in the Reformed tradition. Many are united churches.

The Council was created as an experiment in a new kind of missionary organisation. No longer were the resources to come just from Europe. The Council's churches voted for a democratic structure in which everyone could contribute and receive from each other as equals.

CWM believes that the local church has the primary responsibility for carrying forward God's mission locally. As a global body, the Council exists to help resource-sharing for mission by the CWM partnership of churches.

The Council has four permanent programmes – financial sharing, personnel sharing, mission development and education, and communication – which give encouragement, provide training opportunities, share information and give practical help to the churches' mission programs.

In 2008, CWM launched a partnership with St George's College to operate the 'Face to Face' program in the Holy Land.

The organisation has 32 members in: the Pacific (10), Europe (5), East Asia (6), Southern Africa and the Indian Ocean (5), South Asia (4), and the Caribbean (2).

The Council for World Mission has relocated its secretariat from London to Singapore, and held its Opening Worship for the Council Meeting on 28 October 2012 in Glory Presbyterian Church, Singapore.

References

Archives
 The Archive of the Council for World Mission is held at the School of Oriental and African Studies, London. http://www.soas.ac.uk/library/archives/

External links
CWM Home Page

Christian organizations established in 1977
Christian missions